Luis Ernesto Sharpe  (born June 16, 1960) is a former professional American football tackle who played 13 seasons in the National Football League for the St. Louis/Phoenix/Arizona Cardinals from 1982 through 1994. A 3-time Pro Bowl selection, Sharpe was selected by the Cardinals in the 1st round (16th overall) of the 1982 NFL Draft. He also played for the Memphis Showboats of the USFL in 1985.

Sharpe graduated from UCLA with a degree in political science.

References

1960 births
Sportspeople from Havana
American football offensive linemen
Cuban emigrants to the United States
Arizona Cardinals players
Cuban players of American football
Living people
Memphis Showboats players
National Conference Pro Bowl players
Phoenix Cardinals players
St. Louis Cardinals (football) players
UCLA Bruins football players
Southwestern High School (Michigan) alumni
Players of American football from Detroit